Patricia Alexandra Lucía González Avellán aka La González (born May 15, 1943) is an Ecuadorian singer from Guayaquil. In 2022 she was given Ecuador's highest award for culture.

Life
González was born in Guayaquil in 1943. She began her career in 1970 and she performed at Teatro 9 de Octubre in her home town taking turns to play with Rolando Laserie who was from Cuba. Her early recordings were of boleros by Alberto Cortez and by Rafael Solano. By 1980 she was in Mexico recording rancheras and an album of music from Columbia. 

Over the years she recorded over 40 albums of music which includes 20 LPs.

At the end of July 2021 the Municipal Public Company of Tourism, Civic Promotion and International Relations of Guayaquil arranged a musical concert to celebrate her fifty years of singing. The evening was broadcast and it included special guests and she sang duets with other noted singers.

In 9 August 2022 she was given the Premio Eugenio Espejo for culture by the President of Ecuador at the Palacio de Carondelet. There were three winners that year but the other two awards were for literature or science. The award is given annually and this was the thirtieth year. Her award recognised her 52 years of entertaining. She was given a medal, $10,000 and a life pension set at five time the average national salary.

In October 2002 she was again recognised with an award by the President of the National Assembly, Virgilio Saquicela, when the assembly unusually met in Guayaquil to celebrate 202 years of Ecuador's independence.

References

1943 births
Living people
People from Guayaquil
20th-century Ecuadorian women singers